Events from the year 1334 in Ireland.

Incumbent 
Lord: Edward III

Events 
 Conchobar O Domnaill succeeds his father Aéd as King of Tír Conaill
 Earl of Desmond released
 Justicier Darcy campaigns against Ó Bríain and Mac Conmara in Thomond, Domhnall and Diarmaid Óg Mac Carthaigh in Desmond, Ó Tuathail and Ó Bróin in Leinster
 O Cellaig at war with O Conchobhair, until 1339
 June 29 Thomas de Burgh acting as deputy justiciar

Births

Deaths 

 King Aed of Tir Conaill dies in the habit of a Cistercian at his monastery of Assaroe.

References 

"The Annals of Ireland by Friar John Clyn", edited and translated with an Introduction, by Bernadette Williams, Four Courts Press, 2007. , pp. 240–244.
"A New History of Ireland VIII: A Chronology of Irish History to 1976", edited by T. W. Moody, F.X. Martin and F.J. Byrne. Oxford, 1982. .
http://www.ucc.ie/celt/published/T100001B/index.html
http://www.ucc.ie/celt/published/T100005C/index.html
http://www.ucc.ie/celt/published/T100010B/index.html

 
1330s in Ireland
Ireland
Years of the 14th century in Ireland